Armando Hernández Torres (born 10 January 1981) is a Mexican professional boxer and is the current NABF Minimumweight Champion.

Professional career
On June 18, 2011, Armando beat the veteran Iván Meneses, to win NABF Minimumweight Championship.

WBA Minimumweight Championship
In his next fight Torres will face the WBA Minimumweight Champion Juan Palacios.

Professional record

|- style="margin:0.5em auto; font-size:95%;"
|align="center" colspan=8|16 Wins (11 knockouts), 8 Losses, 0 Draw
|- style="margin:0.5em auto; font-size:95%;"
|align=center style="border-style: none none solid solid; background: #e3e3e3"|Res.
|align=center style="border-style: none none solid solid; background: #e3e3e3"|Record
|align=center style="border-style: none none solid solid; background: #e3e3e3"|Opponent
|align=center style="border-style: none none solid solid; background: #e3e3e3"|Type
|align=center style="border-style: none none solid solid; background: #e3e3e3"|Rd., Time
|align=center style="border-style: none none solid solid; background: #e3e3e3"|Date
|align=center style="border-style: none none solid solid; background: #e3e3e3"|Location
|align=center style="border-style: none none solid solid; background: #e3e3e3"|Notes
|-align=center
| ||  ||align=left|Juan Palacios
| || -  || August 13, 2011 ||align=left|Acapulco, Guerrero, Mexico
|align=left|For the WBA Minimumweight title.
|-align=center

References

External links

Boxers from Mexico City
Light-flyweight boxers
1981 births
Living people
Mexican male boxers